104.7 Muews Radio (104.7 FM) is a radio station owned and operated by Sagay Broadcasting Corporation. The station studio and transmitter are located at Vaflor Bldg., Brgy. Zone 1, Talisay, Negros Occidental.

References

Radio stations in Bacolod
Radio stations established in 2016